The 2013 Miami mayoral election took place on November 5, 2013, to elect the mayor of Miami, Florida. The election was officially nonpartisan, and held in conjunction with other city elections. City Commissioner Francis X. Suarez dropped out before the election in August. Incumbent Tomás Regalado was reelected with over 78% of the vote against his three opponents, none of which got over 10% of the vote.

Results

References

2013
2013 United States mayoral elections
2013 Florida elections
Mayoral election, 2013